Moschatel Press is a small press publisher producing artist's books and poetry collections. It was founded in Nailsworth, Gloucestershire, in 1973, by the artist Laurie Clark and the Scottish poet Thomas A. Clark and moved to Pittenweem, Fife in 2002. The press "is named after adoxa moschatellina, a plant known locally as Town Clock for its four-way green flower heads, with a fifth flower facing the sky." Their main line is in "publishing minimal texts, visual poetry and the like in small neat booklets and postcards."

They have published work by Ian Hamilton Finlay among other artists; although most of their output is their own work which frequently consists of reflections on nature. A treadle press they were given as a wedding present inspired the founding of Moschatel Press, allowing them to print poems and send them to friends. The treadle press was replaced by a tabletop Adana printing press.

Founders
Thomas A. Clark was born in Greenock, Scotland in 1944 and left school, "barely literate", at 15. He then worked in factories and warehouses for the next eight year, before realising "there was a world outside to be lived in".

Clark moved to England in 1967.

Laurie Clark was born in New York in 1949 and married Thomas A. Clark in 1972.

Cairn Gallery
In 1986 the Clarks established the Cairn Gallery initially in Days Mill, Nailsworth, and subsequently in Pittenweem. The Gallery an artist-run space, for land art, minimalism and lyrical or poetic conceptualism.

Publications
The list of publications is first derived from the Moschatel Press Bibliography published by the press itself for an exhibition at the Coracle Press, Camberwell, from 1 December 1979 to 5 January 1980. The list of subsequent publications is not definitive. All works are by Thomas A. Clark unless otherwise stated.

A box set of 67 publications was issued in 1982. Further collections were issued as "A Box Of Landscapes" in 2010 and 2016, comprising publications spanning forty years of the Moschatel Press and others.

In addition to his work with Moschatel Press, Thomas A. Clark led a group of artists installing artworks in the new Stobhill Hospital, Glasgow for its opening in 2009.

Related publications
Other published works by Thomas A. Clark include:
 Bo Heem E Um No.1 - Poems/Editor - Greenock, 1966. (Includes two concrete poems by Dom Sylvester Houédard)
 ARC 8 (number 15) - Arc, Gillingham, Kent, 1970
 Some Particulars - The Jargon Society, 1971
 Epitaphs for Lorine - The Jargon Society, 1973
 Pointing Still - Arc Publications, Gillingham, Kent, 1974
 A Still Life - The Jargon Society, Dentdale 1977
 Arrangement In A Blue Jug - Arnica Press, 1977 (frontispiece by Laurie Clark; 100 signed and numbered copies of which 50 on hand-made paper, 50 on Hochu paper)
 Fragments Of A Walled Garden - Braad Editions, Bretenoux, France, 1977 (illustrations by Laurie Clark; 275 copies of which 26 are signed and numbered)
 Pebbles From A Japanese Garden - Topia Press, New York, 1977 (illustrations by Laurie Clark; 200 copies of which 26 are signed)
 Poetry Information, 18 - Interview by Glyn Pursglove - Peter Hodgkins, London, 1977
 A Ruskin Sketchbook - Coracle Press, London, 1979 (500 copies)
 The Pocket Glade Dictionary - Coach House Press, Toronto, 1980 (300 copies)
 Madder Lake - Coach House Press, Toronto, 1981
 A Garden In The Hills / Un Jardin sur les Monts - Atelier de l'Agneau, Herstal, Belgium, 1981
 Review No 17 - Aggie Weston's, 1981 (with cover illustration by Laurie Clark)
 The Brothers - New Arcadian's Journal no. 8 - New Arcadians, Bradford, 1982 (with illustration by Laurie Clark; 250 numbered copies)
 Adventures Among Birds - Chocolate News Books, Camberwell, 1982 (200 copies)
 In The Open Air - screen prints by John Christie - Circle Press, Guildford, 1982
 Ways Through Bracken - The Jargon Society, 1983
 Twenty Poems - Grosseteste, 1983
 In Praise Of Walking - Cairn Gallery, Nailsworth, 1988 (reprinted 1977 by Walking Bird Press and East Coast Trail Association, Newfoundland, 1977 in 500 numbered copies)
 Riasg Buidhe - with Roger Ackling, 1987
 The Homecoming - Prest Roots Press, Kenilworth, 1988
 Silences of Noons, The Work of F L Griggs (1876-1938) - Exhibition Catalogue - Cheltenham Art Gallery & Museum, 1988 
 Dwellings & Habitations - Prest Roots Press, Kenilworth, 1993
 that which appears - Paragon Press, London, 1994 (250 signed copies, 100 with woodcut by Ian McKeever)
 Clashconnachie - Sad Iron Press, 1998
 One Hundred Scottish Places - Parnassus Press, Eindhoven, 1999 (250 copies)
 Exchanges - with Ian Hamilton Finlay - Wild Hawthorn Press, 1999 (illustrations by Laurie Clark)
 Poet's Poems No. 1 - (Editor) - Aggie Weston's Editions, 2000
 Distance & Proximity - Pocketbooks; Morning Star Publications; Polygon; Taigh Chearsabhagh; National Galleries of Scotland, 2000
 The Path to the Sea - Arc Publications, Todmorden, 2005
 Doire Fhearna - Empty Hands Broadside #8 - Country Valley Press, Gardnerville, NV (100 copies of which 26 are signed)
 I den klare lufta - Nordsjøforlaget, Norway, 2007
 Grey - Longhouse, Green River VT, 2007
 The Hundred Thousand Places - Carcanet Press, 2008
 The Hidden Place - site specific wall painting at Ingleby Gallery, Edinburgh, 2010; also issued as screen print - 100 signed and numbered copies
 Yellow & Blue - Carcanet Press, 2014
 Shade - Corbel Stone Press, 2014 (illustrations by Laurie Clark; 60 copies plus 12 signed and numbered with hand-coloured illustration)
 Farm By The Shore - Carcanet Press, 2017

Other publications featuring drawings by Laurie Clark include:
 A Walk Round Stroud - Stroud Civic Society, 1980
 The Englishwoman's Garden - Chatto & Windus, 1980
 A Country Lane - with Ian Hamilton Finlay - Wild Hawthorn Press, 1983
 The Englishman's Garden - Penguin, 1985
 Docking Competitions - with Erica Van Horn - Coracle, Docking, Norfolk, 1995
 In A Dark Wood - Exhibition at Cheltenham Art Gallery and Museum, November 1994 to January 1995
 Parnassus Parnassia - Parnassus Press, Eindhoven, 1998
 100 Buttercups - WAX366; Fife Contemporary Art & Craft, 2010. Special Editions lettered A-Z include unique pencil drawing.
 100 Harebells - 2012

References

External links
 Worldcat
 Thomas A Clark
 cairn
 Laurie Clark

Artists' books
Book publishing companies of the United Kingdom
Publishing companies established in 1973
Small press publishing companies
Nailsworth